Stefan Thater (born 1968 Hamburg) is a German artist. He graduated from the Academy of Art, Hamburg (HIBK) in 1998. He lives and works in Berlin.

Awards
2000 	Travelling grant by “Junge Kunst in Hamburg e.V.”
2003 	Working grant by the city of Hamburg
2004 	Working grant by the “Stiftung Kunstfonds”
2006 Villa Romana prize

Exhibitions
2010
Dial Shop
2008
Hotel Gallery, London 
2007
“flipside exterior” at Overduin and Kite, Los Angeles 
2006
Galerie Buchholtz, Cologne
2005
Galerie Daniel Buchholz, Cologne (individual exhibition)
Corvi-Mora, London
"Alles. In einer Nacht", Tanya Bonakdar Gallery, New York
2004
"Teil 1 Müllberg", Galerie Daniel Buchholz, Cologne
2003
"Katze, Clown, Roboter", Galerie Karin Guenther, Hamburg (individual exhibition)
2002
"Metropolitan", Galerie Karin Guenther / Galerie Jürgen Becker, Hamburg
Galerie Borgmann-Nathusius, Cologne
2001
"Neue Kunst in Hamburg", Kunsthaus Hamburg
1999
Galerie Daniel Buchholz, Köln (individual exhibition)
"Titles for Drawings", AC Project Room, New York
"Akademie Isotrop", Galerie Daniel Buchholz, Cologne
Gesellschaft der Freunde junger Kunst, Baden-Baden
1998
"Akademie Isotrop", Contemporary Fine Arts, Berlin
"El Nino", Museum Abteiberg, Mönchengladbach
Reality Investment, Ulm
"Akademie Isotrop", Künstlerhaus Stuttgart
1997
Galerie Nomadenoase, Hamburg (individual exhibition)
"Austerlitz Autrement", Espace Austerlitz, Paris for Galerie Daniel Buchholz (individual exhibition)
1996
"Glockengeschrei nach Deutz", Galerie Daniel Buchholz, Cologne

References

External links
"Stefan Thater", Galerie Karin Guenther

Artists from Hamburg
1968 births
Living people
University of Fine Arts of Hamburg alumni